The 1992–93 Rhode Island Rams men's basketball team represented the University of Rhode Island in the 1992–93 college basketball season. This was head coach Al Skinner's fifth of nine seasons at Rhode Island. The Rams competed in the Atlantic 10 Conference and played their home games at Keaney Gymnasium. They finished the season 19–11, 8–6 in A-10 play and lost in the semifinals of the 1993 Atlantic 10 men's basketball tournament. Rhode Island was invited to the 1993 NCAA tournament as No. 8 seed in the East region. In the opening round, they defeated No. 9 seed Purdue, but fell to No. 1 seed and eventual National champion North Carolina in the round of 32.

Roster

Schedule and results

|-
!colspan=9 style=| Regular season

|-
!colspan=9 style=| Atlantic 10 tournament

|-
!colspan=9 style=| NCAA tournament

References

Rhode Island
Rhode Island
Rhode Island Rams men's basketball seasons
Rhode
Rhode